Pueblo Nuevo is a corregimiento within Panama City, in Panamá District, Panamá Province, Panama with a population of 18,984 as of 2010. Its population as of 1990 was 21,289; its population as of 2000 was 18,161.

References

Corregimientos of Panamá Province
Panamá District